Bryan Ryley is a Canadian artist and educator based in Vernon, British Columbia.

Life
Educated at the University of Victoria and the Pratt Institute in Brooklyn, Ryley is currently an Associate Professor of Fine Arts at the University of British Columbia Okanagan.

Work
Throughout his artistic career, Bryan Ryley's work moves back and forth among three media – painting, drawing, and collage.

Ryley exhibits in both Canada and The United States. His work is found in numerous private and public collections, such as, The Canada Council Art Bank, Ottawa; Kelowna Public Art Gallery, Kelowna; Vernon Public Art Gallery; The Pratt Institute in Brooklyn, New York; Petro Canada Collection; Shell Collection in Calgary, Alberta.

References 

Academic staff of the University of British Columbia Okanagan
Living people
Year of birth missing (living people)